Peanuts by Schulz is a children's animated television series adapted for the screen and directed by Alexis Lavillat. It is based on the comic strip of the same name created by Charles M. Schulz. The series first aired in France on November 9, 2014, and later began airing in the United States on Cartoon Network and Boomerang on May 9, 2016, as interstitial shorts. As of 2021, it is currently available on Amazon Prime Video.

The series airs on Rai Gulp in Italy and on France 3 in France.

Cast and characters

English voice cast 
 Aiden Lewandowski as Charlie Brown
 Emma Yarovinsky as Sally Brown
 Bella Stine as Lucy Van Pelt / Crybaby Boobie / Peggy Jean
 Jude Perry as Linus Van Pelt
 Cassidy May Benullo as Frieda / Eudora / Lydia
 Caleel Harris as Franklin
 Lily Zager as Patricia "Peppermint Patty" Reichardt / Molley Volley
 Finn Carr as Rerun van Pelt
 Taylor Autumn Bertman as Marcie / Sally Brown
 Sage Correa as Pig-Pen
 Daniel Thornton as Schroeder / Snoopy
 Andy Beall as Woodstock (uncredited)
 Bill Melendez as Snoopy / Woodstock (archival recordings; uncredited)

France-Based English voice cast 
 Barbara Weber-Scaff as Charlie Brown / Peppermint Patty / Molley Volley
 Kaycie Chase as Linus Van Pelt / Sally Brown / Woodstock / Rerun Van Pelt
 Tiffany Hofstetter as Lucy Van Pelt
 Emma Scherer as Frieda / Marcie
 Shola Adisa-Farrar as Franklin / Pig-Pen
 Sharon Mann as Schroeder / Floyd
 Ann Christine as Lydia
 Robert Brazil

French voice cast 
 Kaycie Chase - Linus Van Pelt / Sally Brown / Woodstock
 Mathilde Hennekinne
 Nathalie Homs
 Caroline Pascal
 Dorothee Pousseo
 Magali Rosenzweig
 Barbara Weber-Scaff

Episodes

Home media 
The first DVD Snoopy Tales containing 32 episodes was released by Warner Home Video on January 24, 2017.

The second DVD Go Team Go! containing 19 episodes was released on April 25, 2017.

The third DVD School Days containing 29 episodes was released on August 19, 2017.

The fourth DVD Peanuts by Schulz: It's Only Love containing 18 episodes was released on January 8, 2019.

The fifth DVD Peanuts by Schulz: Springtime containing 15 episodes was released on February 26, 2019.

The sixth DVD Peanuts by Schulz: Lucy and Friends containing 16 episodes was released on June 4, 2019.

The seventh DVD Peanuts by Schulz: Happy Holidays containing 26 episodes was released on September 10, 2019.

References

External links 
 

2010s American animated television series
2010s American anthology television series
2016 American television series debuts
2016 American television series endings
2010s French animated television series
2014 French television series debuts
2016 French television series endings
American animated television spin-offs
American children's animated anthology television series
American children's animated comedy television series
American flash animated television series
English-language television shows
French-language television shows
French children's animated anthology television series
French animated television spin-offs
French children's animated comedy television series
French flash animated television series
Italian children's animated comedy television series
Italian flash animated television series
Television shows based on comic strips
Animated television series about dogs
Animated television series about birds
Animated television series about children
Television series by DHX Media
Television series by Warner Bros. Television Studios
Works based on Peanuts (comic strip)